Link-Belt Cranes is an American industrial company that develops and manufactures heavy construction equipment, specializing in telescopic and lattice boom cranes. Link-Belt is headquartered in Lexington, Kentucky, and is a subsidiary of the Japanese conglomerate, Sumitomo Heavy Industries.

History
The Link-Belt Construction Equipment Company was founded as Link-Belt Machinery Company in 1880 by William Dana Ewart.  Ewart was a farm implement dealer in Belle Plaine, Iowa.  Ewart conceived the idea of a square detachable chain belt system for use in the harvester equipment, for which he obtained a patent on an "improvement in drive-chain", on September 1, 1874.

In 1939, Link-Belt Co. purchased the Speeder Machinery Corporation, a crane-shovel manufacturer in the 3/8 yard to 3/4 yard capacity range. Speeder had introduced the first wheel mounted excavator, in 1922. Link-Belt's Crane and Shovel Division merged with Speeder Machinery to form the Link-Belt Speeder Corporation, a wholly owned subsidiary of Link-Belt Co., eventually locating in Cedar Rapids, Iowa.

In 1955, The Syntron Company, a manufacturer of vibratory feeders, was purchased by Link-Belt, which was in turn purchased by FMC Corporation in 1965.

In 1967, the FMC Corporation merged with the Link-Belt Company. The company produced FMC Link-Belt branded cranes and excavators.

FMC also produced fire truck fire pumps and pumper bodies, and had an OEM arrangement with Ladder Towers Inc. (LTI) to market aerial ladders.  In the early 1980s the fire apparatus division of FMC tried to expand its role in aerial ladders on fire trucks, leveraging the Link-Belt crane division. FMC was ultimately unsuccessful in its expansion into production of aerial ladders.  The FMC Fire Apparatus division was also ultimately shut down in 1990.

Then in 1986, the Link-Belt Construction Equipment Company was formed as a joint venture between FMC Corporation and Sumitomo Heavy Industries.

In 1998, the excavator products were spun off from the Link-Belt Construction Equipment Company to the LBX Company, a stand-alone, joint-venture company formed between Sumitomo Construction Machinery Co. and Case Corporation to market and sell Link-Belt excavators.

In 2010, Sumitomo (S.H.I.) Construction Machinery Company acquired full ownership of LBX Company.

In 2012 marked the establishment of LBX do Brasil to meet the fast-paced growth of Brazil’s booming excavator construction demands. With LBX do Brasil’s offices, training facilities, and parts depot located in Sorocaba, Sao Paulo, Brazil, LBX do Brasil offers the same world-class support and service to our dealer network and customers in Brazil.

Gallery

See also
 Liebherr Group
 Manitowoc Cranes
 Tadano Limited
 Terex

References
 Link-Belt Construction Equipment Company website, www.linkbelt.com
 LBX Link-Belt Excavators www.lbxco.com

External links

 
 Locomotive Coaling Stations, Link-Belt Co. booklet of cyanotype photographs, c. 1894

Companies based in Lexington, Kentucky
1880 establishments in Iowa
Companies established in 1880
Construction equipment manufacturers of the United States
Sumitomo Heavy Industries